Turkey competed at the 1964 Summer Olympics in Tokyo, Japan.

Medalists

References 

Nations at the 1964 Summer Olympics
1964
1964 in Turkish sport